Gennadi Romanovich Kiselyov (born 3 January 1999) is a Russian football player. He plays for Spartak Kostroma.

Club career
He made his debut in the Russian Professional Football League for FC Lada-Togliatti on 14 April 2016 in a game against FC Chelyabinsk.

He made his Russian Premier League debut for FC Krylia Sovetov Samara on 26 May 2019 in a game against PFC CSKA Moscow, as a 63rd-minute substitute for Mohammed Rabiu.

On 4 February 2020, he was loaned to FC Rotor Volgograd until the end of the 2019–20 season.

References

External links
 
 
 

1999 births
People from Yoshkar-Ola
Sportspeople from Mari El
Living people
Association football midfielders
Russian footballers
Russia youth international footballers
Russia under-21 international footballers
FC Lada-Tolyatti players
PFC Krylia Sovetov Samara players
FC Rotor Volgograd players
FC Irtysh Omsk players
FC Torpedo Moscow players
FC Metallurg Lipetsk players
FC Znamya Truda Orekhovo-Zuyevo players
FC Spartak Kostroma players
Russian Premier League players
Russian First League players
Russian Second League players